The Kavli Institute for the Physics and Mathematics of the Universe (IPMU) is an international research institute for physics and mathematics situated in Kashiwa, Japan, near Tokyo. Its full name is "Kavli Institute for the Physics and Mathematics of the Universe, The University of Tokyo Institutes for Advanced Study, the University of Tokyo, Kashiwa, Japan".

The main subjects of study at IPMU are particle physics, high energy physics, astrophysics, astronomy and mathematics. The institute addresses five key questions: "How did the universe begin? What is its fate? What is it made of? What are its fundamental laws? Why do we exist?"

History 

The Institute for the Physics and Mathematics of the Universe was created on October 1, 2007, by its founding director Hitoshi Murayama and the University of Tokyo. It is funded by the Japanese Ministry of Science, as a part of their World Premier International Research Center Initiative. In 2012, the IPMU received an endowment from the Kavli Foundation and was renamed the Kavli Institute for the Physics and Mathematics of the Universe.

Members of IPMU 

Many notable scientists are employed at the IPMU. Among them:

 Takaaki Kajita
 Mikhail Kapranov
 Stavros Katsanevas
 Young-Kee Kim
 Toshiyuki Kobayashi
 Hitoshi Murayama 
 Hiraku Nakajima
 Yasunori Nomura
 Hirosi Ooguri
 David Spergel
 Yuji Tachikawa

References

External links 
 Kavli IPMU site
 Kavli Institute for the Physics and Mathematics of the Universe, Japan (video, 7:25)
 Sixty Years of Science for Peace and Development (UN lecture, video, 13:17)

Research institutes in Japan
Physics institutes
Mathematical institutes
Kavli Institutes
University of Tokyo